The Adventures of the Galaxy Rangers is an American animated space Western television series created by Robert Mandell and Gaylord Entertainment Company.  It was broadcast in syndication between 1986 and 1989. The series combines sci-fi stories with traditional wild west themes.  It is one of the first anime-style shows produced mainly in the United States, although the actual animation was done by the Japanese animation studio Tokyo Movie Shinsha.  At the time it aired, The Adventures of the Galaxy Rangers was considered a revolutionary children's show.

Plot

The show is set in the future, some time after the year 2086, when two aliens from the planets Andor and Kirwin travel to Earth to search for allies against the expansionist Crown Empire led by the Queen of the Crown. In return for the help, the two aliens gave mankind construction plans for a hyperdrive device. After this key event in human history, interstellar travel flourished and a huge number of colonies emerged in distant star-systems. Alongside the growth of human activities in space, criminal activities also grew, and the new colonies required defense against various threats, including the Crown Empire. A group known as "BETA" (Bureau for Extra-Terrestrial Affairs) was founded to cope with these tasks, with a "Ranger" division being a part of it. BETA is shown to be the major military and exploratory arm of Earth. The organization's headquarters are on Earth.  BETA sustains several bases on and around Earth, such as the Longshot Research Facility in the Grand Canyon and the BETA space station in Earth's orbit.

Most of the colonies portrayed in the show specialized in either agriculture or mining "star stones". Many of the planets on the show have names that evoke ideas of a Western setting, Nebraska, Mesa, Ozark, and Prairie being a few.

After the catalyst first episode, "Phoenix", where one of the main characters, Zachary Foxx, loses his wife to the Queen of the Crown, he puts together a group called the Galaxy Rangers, dedicated to providing law and order across the new frontier, ultimately trying to get rid of the Crown Empire. Each ranger is equipped with an experimental piece of tech called the Series-5 to boost natural abilities.

The Series-5 Brain Implant, or S5, is implied to be the closest mankind will ever get to merging with cybernetics. The S5 implant enables a dramatic boost of innate abilities due to its unique conversion of bio-electrical power generated by alpha radiation stored within the badges worn by the Galaxy Rangers.

The Crown Empire, also known as the "Crown," is ruled by the Queen of the Crown, whose intentions and motivations are described as being evil. She controls a large number of planets in a vast section of the galaxy, all of which she rules as a cruel tyrant. The Queen controls her empire using creatures called Slaver Lords with whom she has a psychic link. Slaver Lords derive their power from the psychic energy of other beings. After the Empire encountered humans, the Queen discovered that they were more suitable for energy extraction than any other previously encountered species.

Characters

Zachary Foxx 

Zachary Foxx is the captain of the Series-5 Rangers. He was seriously injured in a battle with a space Pirate named Captain Kidd and his entire left side was replaced with bionics, allowing him to fire blasts of energy with his left arm and giving him extraordinary strength. Within Captain Zachary Foxx, the implant's function is simply to act as a power conduit: triggering the badge activates a sequence of events that supercharges his left-side bionics and enables either a boosting of the myomer muscles and tendons, or a channeling of bio-electrical energy through the bionic amplifiers to produce an energy blast of up to 16 standard carbine shots, which makes him capable of blasting a wall apart, spot-welding circuitry, or possibly punching through a ship's hull. He is married and a father of two. His wife's mind was kidnapped by the Queen of the Crown and is contained in a "psychocrystal".

Foxx was voiced by veteran actor Jerry Orbach.

Shane Gooseman 

Shane "Goose" Gooseman was genetically produced in a test tube as part of a government genetic experiment to create a group of enhanced mutant soldiers known as "Supertroopers". A civilian adviser dosed the Supertroopers with a gas meant to speed up their mutation and make them more powerful, but it had the side effect of making the Supertroopers more aggressive and mentally unstable. Goose was at the firing range at the time, and thus avoided the gas, thereby becoming the only remaining unaffected trooper. The other troopers had to be cryogenically imprisoned, but some escaped. Goose was given the option to avoid cryogenic freezing on the condition that he join the Galaxy Rangers and hunt down the escaped Supertroopers. His Series-5 bionic implants allow him limited control over his body's molecules giving him the ability to heal, absorb energies, and adapt to various environmental conditions by temporary shape-shifting his body to adapt based on his situation or environment. Goose's implant supercharges his genetic bio-defenses, enabling them to react almost instantly, instead of minutes or hours, as would normally happen. This brings him close to the level of the rogue Supertroopers, and makes him the only one capable of going one-on-one with them in personal combat. His characterization is heavily inspired by Clint Eastwood. It is also noted during the show's credits that he is the only Supertrooper with compassion.

Niko 

Niko is an archaeologist specializing in ancient cultures and has innate psychic abilities. She carries a large gun and knows martial arts. Her Series-5 implant boosts her psychic abilities and she can create shields, lift objects, and has clairvoyance. Niko's implant acts as a psychic amplifier, boosting her innate psychic abilities by adding power from the converted radiation into a psionic boost which can increase her range from simple tactile up to light years distant. She can also generate a shield of ambient energy which will dramatically drain her implant, but can be augmented by touching the other rangers and drawing power from them. This shield can defend against all forms of attack, but cannot be held for long. Throughout the series a romantic tension exists between her and Goose.

Born on the failed colony world of Alspeth, she was found after the destruction of her colony by Ariel from the haven world of Xanadu. Having been relocated to her new haven, Niko was raised and her psychic abilities were nurtured. At the age of 19, she left Xanadu to return to her people and joined the Galaxy Rangers. After the academy, she was accepted into the experimental Series-5 program. She was later assigned to the Series 5 Rangers as their mystic and archaeological expert, due to the number of missions they embarked on involving new cultures and varied belief systems.

Walter Hartford 

Walter "Doc" Hartford is a swashbuckling character who fights with a sword, a gun, and his fists. He is a computer genius who, along with the BETA Scientist 'Q-Ball', is responsible for most of the automated systems that the Galaxy Rangers use daily. His Series-5 implants allow him to communicate with and control special programs called 'tweakers', which appear as flying holographic computer animated geometric shapes. Ranger Hartford's implant produces the oddest effects - and they still cannot properly be explained. Commander Walsh puts it best: "Doc Hartford, your implant makes you a computer wizard, able to conjure fantastic programs."

Doc carries a Computer Diagnostic Unit; a compact computer which has advanced diagnostics and maintenance functions, along with sensory and computer linkage capability. The CDU acts as a focus for Doc's implant power, and also as a storage facility for his "tweakers" (Pathfinder, Tripwire, Firefly, Searchlight, Lifeline, and Pixel). His "tweaker" computer programs are part of his personality and offer capabilities far beyond any normal computer program, virus, or worm. His implant gives him control over his "tweakers" via simple verbal communication, and his "tweakers" give Doc control over any computer system.

Hartford, from the Island of Jamaica, was born to wealthy parents, and so he was educated in private school, topped off with Mrs. Abercrombies Charm and Finishing School. He left there to join the Ranger Corps after he signed up with some biochemical corporations to help them produce better computer programs, but found out that his skills were not being challenged.

Episodes

Theme songs

"No Guts, No Glory"
The theme song for the show, "No Guts, No Glory", was featured in the opening credits and preceded by a spoken introduction. The song was written and composed by Phil Galdston and John Van Tongeren, and performed by Van Tongeren using the stage name Johnny Vancouver. The song was also featured in the end credits for episodes 1-35 and episode 37.

"Rangers Ride Forever"
The song "Rangers Ride Forever" (commonly known as "Rangers Are Forever"), which featured as the end theme for episodes 36 and 38-65, was performed by the UK rock/AOR band FM, whose lead singer is Steve Overland. FM also performed the song "Showdown" (commonly referred to as "Out Beyond The Stars"), which was included as foreground music in several episodes. Both songs were written and composed by brothers Steve and Chris Overland.

Home releases
Hasbro's Entertainment One currently owns the DVD distributions rights to Galaxy Rangers through Koch Vision (and 20th Century Fox Home Entertainment in several non-US countries). Four Galaxy Rangers DVDs, each containing four episodes, were released in the United States.  Koch has released the entire series which consists of two box sets. The first set was released on May 13, 2008 and the second set was released on August 19, 2008

KSM Film in Germany released the series on DVD in 5 episode volumes from May to November 2005, 25 episode volumes from April to August 2006, a complete set (65 episodes over 4 discs) in June 2008 with a Blu-ray (65 episodes on 1 disc) version released in November 2012. The Blu Ray version is presented in standard definition.

Reception
The show has become a cult favorite and been considered innovative and ahead of its time.  It had a unique sense of humor, and each character was well defined, without the trait of clichés to sell toys which was common among shows at that time.

See also

 BraveStarr
 Princess Gwenevere and the Jewel Riders
 Saber Rider and the Star Sheriffs (heavily edited English version of Sei Jushi Bismarck)

References

Further reading
 The Adventures of the Galaxy Rangers Annual 1989

External links
 
 
 The Hearst Animation Official Galaxy Rangers Website
 Toonopedia - Galaxy Rangers

1986 American television series debuts
1986 American television series endings
1980s American animated television series
1980s American science fiction television series
1980s toys
Western (genre) animated television series
American children's animated action television series
American children's animated space adventure television series
American children's animated science fiction television series
Animated television series about extraterrestrial life
Anime-influenced Western animated television series
English-language television shows
First-run syndicated television programs in the United States
Marvel UK titles
TMS Entertainment
Space Western television series
Television series set in the 2080s
1980s Western (genre) television series
Television series set in the future
Television series by Gaylord Entertainment Company